In enzymology, a sarcosine reductase is an enzyme that catalyzes the chemical reaction

acetyl phosphate + methylamine + thioredoxin disulfide  N-methylglycine + phosphate + thioredoxin

The 3 substrates of this enzyme are acetyl phosphate, methylamine, and thioredoxin disulfide, whereas its 3 products are N-methylglycine, phosphate, and thioredoxin.

This enzyme belongs to the family of oxydoreductases, specifically those acting on X-H and Y-H to form an X-Y bond with a disulfide as acceptor.  The systematic name of this enzyme class is acetyl-phosphate methilamine:thioredoxin disulfide oxydoreductase (M-methylglycine-forming).

References

Further reading 

 
 

EC 1.21.4
Enzymes of unknown structure